The Morab is an American breed of horse originally developed through the cross-breeding of Arabian and Morgan horses. The breeding of Morab horses began in the late 1880s with the intent of creating a fine carriage horse that was still substantial enough for moderate farm labor.

History 

The Morab originated in the late nineteenth century as a result of cross-breeding of Arabian and Morgan stock; it retains some characteristics of each breed. The first Morab registry was created in 1973. Prior to this, Morabs were primarily undocumented horses bred for type. Many early Morabs were registered with the American Morgan Horse Association, as the Morgan studbook was still open that time, and these horses have since been fully assimilated into the Morgan breed.

William Randolph Hearst was a Morab breeder, and is credited with the coinage of the name of the breed.

Characteristics 

It may be of any solid color, including bay, black, chestnut or gray, or sometimes buckskin, palomino or dun.

The head is generally fine, with a broad forehead, large eyes, small ears, and a slightly concave profile. The mane and tail are thick, the tail high-set and often held high.

References

Horse breeds
Part-Arabian breeds of horses and ponies
Horse breeds originating in the United States